"Redefinition" is a song by the Danish dance-pop duo Infernal. It was the fourth and final single released from their 2008 album Electric Cabaret on 27 April 2009 after undoubtedly being the favourite track among fans. Unlike the three previous singles, "Redefinition" is not co-written by Adam Powers. It is also the only single from the album that did not enter the charts.

Infernal released the music video of the song to registered users on their website, and later to the video-sharing website YouTube. The song debuted on Danish radio stations via a promotional CD in April 2009. It is the opening song of "Salotto", a discopub in Varese.

The music video was filmed on 3 March 2009 in Manhattan, New York City and was directed by Loïc Maes.

Track listing

Personnel
Written by Paw Lagermann, Lina Rafn
Performed by Infernal
Arranged, produced, recorded and mixed by Infernal at Infernal Studio and at Powers Studio
Additional vocal production and recording by Anders Øhrstrøm at Playground Studio
Additional vocals by Paw Lagermann, Lina Rafn, Anders Øhrstrøm, Pernille Kehlert Øhrstrøm
Guitar by Jimmy Dee
Additional drums by Thomas Holmen
Additional keyboards by Anders Øhrstrøm
Orchestral programming by Anders Øhrstrøm
Mastered by Jan Eliasson at Audio Planet
"Redefinition" (Jason Gault Remix): Remix and additional production by Jason Gault for Traxstarz BV at Gaultmine Studio
"Redefinition" (Jack Dizzle Remix): Remix and additional production by Casper Østergaard at JD Studio, Copenhagen
"Redefinition" (Morten Hampenberg Remix): Remix and additional production by Morten Hampenberg
"Redefinition" (Laywell Remix): Remix and additional production by Laywell
"Redefinition" (Barylak's Club Mix): Remix and additional production by Daniel Barylak

References

External links

2009 singles
Infernal (Danish band) songs
Songs written by Paw Lagermann
Songs written by Lina Rafn
2008 songs
Songs about disco